The name camas prairie refers to several different geographical areas in the western United States which were named for the native perennial camassia or camas. The culturally and scientifically significant of these areas lie within Idaho and Montana. Camas bulbs were an important food source for Native Americans.

Idaho

History

Named for the blue flowering camas—an important food source for all Native Americans in the interior Northwest—the Camas Prairie is a traditional Nez Perce gathering place in north central Idaho.

From the Nez Perce National Historical Park: Camas Prairie is interpreted at a highway pullout on the north side of U.S. Highway 95, about six miles (10 km) south of Grangeville. This large prairie was a Nez Perce gathering place, where camas roots were harvested for thousands of years. Several nontreaty bands gathered at Tolo Lake in early June 1877 in anticipation of moving to the Nez Perce reservation. In response to the forced move and other hostile actions, several young Nez Perce people took actions that precipitated the Nez Perce War.

Camas Prairie is a large area, mostly privately owned, that extends many miles between the Salmon and Clearwater River drainages. Most of the area is agricultural and the northern section is within the Nez Perce Indian Reservation. Similar to the opening of lands in Oklahoma, the U.S. government opened the reservation for white settlement on November 18, 1895. The proclamation had been signed less than two weeks earlier by President Cleveland.

The area was home to the second subdivision of the Camas Prairie Railroad, known as the "railroad on stilts" due to its numerous trestles, most of which were timber. Breakheart Pass, a 1975 film starring Charles Bronson, was filmed on portions of the railroad on the Camas Prairie. The railroad ceased operations in the late 1990s.

For more information:
National Park Service - Nez Perce
U.S. Forest Service - Nez Perce

Communities

 Grangeville
 Fenn
 Greencreek
 Cottonwood

 Ferdinand
 Craigmont
 Winchester
 Reubens

Counties

 Idaho County
 Lewis County

 Camas County - in southern Idaho

Southern Idaho
In southern Idaho, east of Mountain Home, the high plain of Camas County around Fairfield is locally called the "Camas Prairie."

Protected Areas
 Camas Prairie Centennial Marsh Wildlife Management Area

Montana
The Camas Prairie covers the floor of the Camas Prairie Basin in Sanders County. This basin is a distinct north–south oriented elliptical basin that is drained by Camas Creek into the Flathead River at Perma, Montana. Both the prairie and basin are surrounded by north-south trending mountain ranges except where Camas Creek drains into the Flathead River. The center of this relatively flat basin lies at elevations just below . The basin is bordered by the Salish Mountains on its eastern side and northern end and bordered by the Cabinet Mountains on its western side.

The Camas Prairie region is sparsely populated and lies within the Flathead Indian Reservation. The two main populated places within this region are Camas (Ktunaxa: ya·qa·kmumaǂki) and Perma (Ktunaxa: kxunamaʔnam)

Bedrock Geology
The basin in which the Camas Prairie lies is a low-relief valley surrounded by mountains composed of metasedimentary strata that belong to the Prichard Formation of the Belt Supergroup. These strata are intensively folded and thrust faulted. The basin is filled with undifferentiated Cenozoic red, greenish, and bluish siltstone and mudstone and volcanic rock. A few sandy and gravelly beds are also present. These strata outcrop at the surface around the perimeter of the basin.

Quaternary Geology
The Camas Prairie is well-known for the large fields of Late Pleistocene giant current ripples that cover a substantial part of its surface. They were created during one of the many times when glacial Lake Missoula drained when its ice dam failed. From the northern edge of the Camas Basin, the fields of giant current ripples extend south (downcurrent) from four mountain passes that were once submerge inlets into the flooded Camas Basin. Southward, these fields of giant current ripples spread out and merge on the basin floor. These sedimentary bedforms are best seen in aerial images and at low sun angles.

These giant current ripples are large-to-very-large, subaqueous gravel dunes and antidunes. They are all two-dimensional, flow transverse, sinuous, sedimentary bedforms. The wavelength and height of these giant current ripples decrease away (downcurrent) from the former inlets. Correspondingly, the size of the gravels comprising them decreases south (downcurrent) from boulder and cobble gravels to pebble gravels. Their foreset bedding is poorly defined and their dip varies from 14 to 23 degrees. In addition to the gravel dunes and antidunes, delta-like, expansion bars accumulated below each of the former subaqueous inlets. They consist of foreset beds that consist of boulder-cobble-pebble gravels.

The Pleistocene deposits and bedforms in the basin have not been dated using radiometric dating methods. The lack of absolute dates prevents the construction of a reliable geochronology for Lake Missoula lake drainage events in the Camas Prairie basin and correlation of the giant current ripples with bedforms and sedimentary deposits outside of it.

The exposed gravel deposits underlying the giant current ripples at Camas Prairie exhibit at least two beds of gravelly deposits that are indicative of deposition by separate Missoula floods. They are separated by an erosional unconformity with a buried and dismembered calcrete, carbonate soil horizon. It provides empirical evidence of at least two separate periods of giant current ripple activity and associated with separate Missoula Floods that occurred thousands of years apart based the thickness and development of the calcrete.

The giant current ripples of the Camas Prairie are analogous to similar giant Pleistocene bedforms described form Channeled Scablands of Washington. They are identical to the giant subaqueous bedrooms that formed on the bottom of Lake Kuray-Chuya during the Altai flood in Siberia, Russia. These giant bedforms, which are rare or unknown outside of theoretical and experimental studies, preserved a unique record of the paleohydraulology of a Missoula Flood associated with the catastrophic emptying of Lake Missoula.

See also
 Ice Age Floods National Geologic Trail
Palouse prairie

References

External links
Visit North Central Idaho – Camas Prairie
Eye of Idaho – Around Camas Prairie
Idaho Public TV – Camas Prairie Railroad
Historical Museum at St. Gertrude
Monastery of St. Gertrude
Glacial Lake Missoula.org – Camas Prairie ripple marks in Montana

Plants by habitat
Regions of Idaho
Regions of Montana
Grasslands of the United States
Grasslands of Idaho
Grasslands of Montana
Geography of Washington (state)
Flora of the Northwestern United States
Geography of Camas County, Idaho
Geography of Idaho County, Idaho
Geography of Lewis County, Idaho
Nez Perce National Historical Park